Zafra troglodytes is a species of sea snail in the family Columbellidae, the dove snails.

Description
Shell size varies between 2 mm and 6 mm.

Distribution
This species is distributed in the Red Sea and in the Indian Ocean along Madagascar and in the Western Pacific Ocean.

References

 Dautzenberg, Ph. (1929). . Faune des Colonies Francaises, Tome III
 

troglodytes
Gastropods described in 1866